The Battle of the Dukla Pass, also known as the Dukla, Carpatho–Dukla, Rzeszów–Dukla, or Dukla–Prešov offensive, was the battle for control over the Dukla Pass on the border between Poland and Slovakia on the Eastern Front of World War II between Nazi Germany and the Soviet Union in September–October 1944. It was part of the Soviet East Carpathian strategic offensive that also included the Carpathian–Uzhgorod offensive. The operation's primary goal, to provide support for the Slovak rebellion, was not achieved, but it concluded the full liberation of the Ukrainian SSR.

The German resistance in the eastern Carpathian region was much stronger than expected. The battle which began on 8 September would not see the Soviet forces on the other side of the pass until 6 October, and German forces would stop their heavy resistance in the region only around 10 October. Five days to Prešov turned into fifty days to Svidník alone with over 70,000 casualties on both sides. Prešov that was to be reached in six days remained beyond the Czechoslovaks' grasp for four months. The battle would be counted among the most bloody in the entire Eastern Front and the history of Slovakia; one of the valleys in the pass, near the villages of Kapišová, Chyrowa, Iwla and Głojsce, would become known as the "Valley of Death".

Background
In summer 1944, Slovaks rebelled against the Nazis and the Czechoslovak government appealed to Soviets for help. On 31 August, Soviet marshal Ivan Konev was ordered to prepare plans for an offensive to destroy Nazi forces in Slovakia. The plan was to push through the old Slovak-Polish border in the Carpathian Mountains via the Dukla Pass near Svidník to penetrate Slovakia proper.

In the meantime, however, the Germans had fortified the region, forming the Karpatenfestung ("Carpathian fortress") or Árpád Line.

Battle
The Soviet operation plan called for the Soviet forces to cross the pass and capture the town of Prešov within five days.

The operation started on 8 September. It took the Soviets three days to take Krosno (it was captured on 11 September). One of the biggest battles in the pass took place on and around Hill 534 in the northwest from the town of Dukla; the battle to capture this hill lasted from 10 to 20 September, and during that period the control of the hill changed more than 20 times. The town of Dukla was seized on 21 September. The area of the former Czechoslovak state border—heavily fortified by the Germans—was captured on 6 October; it took almost a month for the Soviet forces to reach Slovakia.

The Dukla operation did not end when the Soviets forced the pass. The combat zone shifted to Eastern Slovakia, with Soviet forces trying to outflank and push back the German forces, still strong and having many fortified positions. South of the pass and directly west of the village of Dobroslava lies an area that has come to be known as the "Valley of Death". Here Soviet and German armor clashed in a miniature reenactment of the great tank battle of Kursk. Soviet and Czechoslovak forces would enter Svidník on 28 October. A major German fortified position near the pass, Hill 532 "Obšár", would be secured as late as on 25 November 1944.

Aftermath
The Slovak National Uprising was mostly crushed by the time Soviet units secured Slovak territories; one of the main reasons for this was that the German resistance in the Dukla Pass was much heavier than expected. Another factor was that the Slovak insurgent forces failed to secure the other side of the pass, as planned by the Slovak and Soviet commanders during early preparations.

In 1949, the Czechoslovak government erected a memorial and cemetery southeast of the Dukla border crossing, in Vyšný Komárnik, the first liberated village on the territory of (then) Czechoslovakia. It contains the graves of several hundred Soviet and Czechoslovak soldiers. Several other memorials and cemeteries have also been erected in the region.

In 1956, the football club ATK Praha changed their name to Dukla Praha (Dukla Prague) in honour of those who had fallen in the battle.

Order of battle

Soviet Union
Elements of 1st Ukrainian Front, Marshal Ivan Konev commanding
38th Army (Kirill Moskalenko)
Czechoslovak 1st Army Corps (Ludvík Svoboda)
Elements of 4th Ukrainian Front:
Soviet 1st Guards Army (Andrei Grechko)

Germany
Army Group Heinrici
1st Panzer Army (Gotthard Heinrici)
Elements of Hungarian First Army (Dezső László)

Notes

References
Andrusikiewicz J., Boje o Przełęcz Dukielską (w:) "Wierchy" t. 37, Kraków 1968
 
Grzywacz-Świtalski Ł., Z walk na Podkarpaciu, Warszawa 1971
Luboński P., Operacja dukielsko-preszowska (w:) Magury’ 83, Warszawa 1983
Michalak J., Dukla i okolice, Krosno 1996

External links
Post-Dukla 1944 Soviet Offensive Operations in Eastern Slovakia
Maps of operations in the Carpathian Mountains including the battle of the Dukla Pass: http://rkkaww2.armchairgeneral.com/maps/1944SW/1UF/CZ/s17_Carpatians_Sep_Nov44_eng.jpg, http://www.rkka.ru/maps/dukl.gif, https://web.archive.org/web/20080529154931/http://rkkaww2.armchairgeneral.com/maps/1944SW/1UF/CZ/38A_Dukla_s04_Sept27_Nov8_44.gif
Diorama painting and Google Earth view of the pass
Description of PL-SK border crossing events by units of the 1st Czechoslovak Army Corps during operation 

Conflicts in 1944
1944 in Czechoslovakia
Battles and operations of the Soviet–German War
Battles and operations of World War II involving Czechoslovakia
Battles and operations of World War II involving Hungary
Czechoslovakia–Soviet Union relations
Battles of World War II involving Germany
September 1944 events
October 1944 events
Tank battles of World War II
Battle of Dukla Pass